Cisita Joity Jansen (born 31 October 1990) is a German badminton player of Indonesian origin. In 2005, she placed third at the Singapore Cheers tournament, and recruited by PB Djarum badminton club in 2007. In 2013, she became the runner-up of Slovenian International tournament in mixed doubles event with her brother Jones Ralfy Jansen. She won her first senior international tournament at the 2014 Finnish International tournament in the mixed doubles event.

Achievements

BWF International Challenge/Series 
Women's doubles

Mixed doubles

  BWF International Challenge tournament
  BWF International Series tournament
  BWF Future Series tournament

References

External links 
 

1990 births
Living people
Sportspeople from Jakarta
Minahasa people
Indonesian female badminton players
German people of Indonesian descent
German female badminton players